Kalilou Mohamed Traoré (born 9 September 1987) is a Malian former professional footballer who played as midfielder.

Career
Traoré began his career with AS Real Bamako in 2005. He signed a contract with Wydad Casablanca in the summer of 2006. In July 2007 he played on loan to Hassania Agadir and returned to Wydad Casablanca on 14 July 2008.

Traoré signed with NK Istra 1961 in August 2008. After his successful first season with 9 goals in 27 games, he was linked with Hajduk Split and NK Dinamo Zagreb.
He signed with OB in 2010.

In September 2012, Traoré joined Sochaux. In June 2014, he agreed the termination of his contract with Sochaux.

Honours
Mali
Africa Cup of Nations bronze: 2013

References

External links
 
 

1987 births
Living people
Sportspeople from Bamako
Association football midfielders
Malian footballers
Malian expatriate footballers
Expatriate footballers in Morocco
Expatriate footballers in Croatia
Expatriate footballers in France
Expatriate men's footballers in Denmark
Malian expatriate sportspeople in Morocco
Malian expatriate sportspeople in Croatia
Malian expatriate sportspeople in France
Malian expatriate sportspeople in Denmark
AS Korofina players
NK Istra 1961 players
AS Real Bamako players
Hassania Agadir players
Odense Boldklub players
Danish Superliga players
FC Sochaux-Montbéliard players
Ligue 1 players
2013 Africa Cup of Nations players
Mali international footballers
21st-century Malian people